Claude Fauchet (22 September 1744 – 31 October 1793) was a French bishop.

Biography 
He was born at Dornes, Nièvre. He was a curate of the church of St Roch, Paris, when he was engaged as tutor to the children of the marquis of Choiseul, brother of Louis XVs minister, an appointment which proved to be the first step to fortune. He was successively grand vicar to the archbishop of Bourges, preacher to the king, and abbot of Montfort-Lacarre.

The philosophic tone of his sermons caused his dismissal from court in 1788 before he became a popular speaker in the Parisian sections. He was one of the leaders of the attack on the Bastille, and on 5 August 1789 he delivered an eloquent discourse by way of funeral sermon for the citizens slain on 14 July, taking as his text the words of St Paul, "Ye have been called to liberty".

He blessed the tricolour flag for the National Guard, and in September was elected to the Commune, from which he retired in October 1790. During the next winter he organized within the Palais Royal the Social Club of the Society of the Friends of Truth, presiding over crowded meetings under the self-assumed title of procureur general de la vérité. Nevertheless, events were marching faster than his opinions, and the last occasion on which he carried his public with him was in a sermon preached at Notre Dame on 4 February 1791.

In May he became constitutional bishop of Calvados, and was presently returned by the department to the Legislative Assembly, and afterwards to the Convention. At the king's trial he voted for the appeal to the people and for the penalty of imprisonment. He protested against the execution of Louis XVI in the Journal des amis (26 January 1793), and next month was denounced to the Convention for prohibiting married priests from the exercise of the priesthood in his diocese. He remained secretary to the Convention until, the accusation of the Girondists in May 1793.

In July he was imprisoned on the charge of supporting the federalist movement at Caen, and of complicity with Charlotte Corday, whom he had taken to see a sitting of the Convention on her arrival in Paris. Of the second of these charges he was certainly innocent.  With the Girondist deputies he was brought before the revolutionary tribunal on 30 October, and was guillotined on the following day.

Despite his role in the church, earlier authors of this entry suggest he was a member of the atheistic secret society the Illuminati, "whose Plan is to overturn all Government and all Religion, even natural; and who endeavour to eradicate every Idea of a Supreme Being, and distinguish Man from Beast by his Shape only." However, this understanding is likely based on a misreading of Snyder's letters to George Washington, which referred to a Fauchet as Illuminati. However, when the referenced letter is read contextually with the mention of Genêt, the French Envoy to America, the discussed Fauchet is likely Jean Antoine Joseph Fauchet, who actually visited the United States to arrest Genêt.

References

Sources 
  This further cites:
 Mémoires . . . ou Lettres de Claude Fauchet (5th ed., 79,3)
 Notes sur Claude Fauchet (Caen, 1842)

1744 births
1793 deaths
People from Nièvre
Politicians from Bourgogne-Franche-Comté
Girondins
Deputies to the French National Convention
Constitutional bishops
French people executed by guillotine during the French Revolution